Innes Murray (born 17 February 1998) is a Scottish footballer who plays as a midfielder for Edinburgh. He has previously played for Hibernian, Stenhousemuir, Airdrieonians, Alloa Athletic.

Career

Hibernian
Born in Edinburgh, Murray played youth football with Celtic, before joining Hibernian in August 2016. He joined Stenhousemuir on loan in August 2017, with that loan later extended until the end of the season. He appeared in nineteen league matches for Stenhousemuir and scored twice.

On 31 January 2020, he joined Scottish League One side Airdrieonians on loan, He made his debut for the club on 8 February 2020 in a 0–0 draw away to Dumbarton, and appeared a further four times during the 2019–20 season before it was curtailed due to the COVID-19 pandemic.

He joined Scottish Championship side Alloa Athletic on a season-long loan in September 2020. His first appearance for them came on 10 October 2020 in a 2–1 Scottish League Cup defeat to Livingston. 

Murray was loaned to Edinburgh City in August 2021. He was released by Hibs in June 2022, at the end of his contract.

Edinburgh
Following his release by Hibs, Murray signed a two-year contract with Edinburgh.

Career statistics

References

External links

1998 births
Living people
Scottish footballers
Footballers from Edinburgh
Association football midfielders
Hibernian F.C. players
Stenhousemuir F.C. players
Airdrieonians F.C. players
Alloa Athletic F.C. players
Scottish Professional Football League players
F.C. Edinburgh players